The Wood and Allied Workers' Union (PEL) was a trade union representing workers in the wood industry in Finland.

The union was founded in 1993, when the Wood Workers' Union merged with the Rural Workers' Union.  Like its predecessors, the union affiliated to the Central Organisation of Finnish Trade Unions.  By 1998, it had 51,455 members.  In 2014, the union shortened its name, to become the Wood Union.

In 2017, the union merged with the Metalworkers' Union and the Industrial Union TEAM, to form the Industrial Union.

Presidents
1993: Heikki Peltonen
1997: Kalevi Vanhala
2009: Sakari Lepola
2014: Jari Nilosaari

References

Timber industry trade unions
Trade unions in Finland
Trade unions established in 1993
Trade unions disestablished in 2017